Baïbokoum Airport  is a public use airport located near Baïbokoum, Logone Oriental, Chad.

See also
List of airports in Chad

References

External links
 Airport record for Baïbokoum Airport at Landings.com

Airports in Chad
Logone Oriental Region